The Mont Lachat is a summit in the French Alps, culminating at a height of  in the Bornes Massif.

References 

Mountains of the Alps
Mountains of Haute-Savoie
Two-thousanders of France